The 1927 Kansas Jayhawks football team represented the University of Kansas in the Missouri Valley Conference during the 1927 college football season. In their second and final season under head coach Franklin Cappon, the Jayhawks compiled a 3–4–1 record (3–3–1 against conference opponents), finished in fifth place in the conference, and were outscored by opponents by a combined total of 146 to 89. They played their home games at Memorial Stadium in Lawrence, Kansas; the stadium's capacity was increased to 35,000 in 1927 with completion of the north bowl. Barrett Hamilton was the team captain.

Schedule

References

Kansas
Kansas Jayhawks football seasons
Kansas Jayhawks football